Grebenac (Serbian Cyrillic: Гребенац, Romanian: Grebenaț) is a village in Vojvodina, Serbia. It is situated in the Bela Crkva municipality, in the South Banat District, Vojvodina province. The village has a Romanian ethnic majority (82.3%) and a population of 1,017 (2002 census).

Name
In Serbian, the village is known as Grebenac (Гребенац), in Romanian as Grebenaț, in Hungarian as Gerebenc, and in German as Grebenatz.

Historical population

Romanian presence is attested by a stone cross in the local graveyard, from 1297 and by a document in Wiena about a trial between Luca family and another local family.

1961: 2,129
1971: 2,040
1981: 1,893
1991: 1,608

Personalities
Vasko Popa, poet; studies at the University of Bucharest and in Vienna. During World War II, he fought as a partisan and was imprisoned in a German concentration camp.

See also
List of places in Serbia
List of cities, towns and villages in Vojvodina

References

Slobodan Ćurčić, Broj stanovnika Vojvodine, Novi Sad, 1996.

External links
 Map of the Bela Crkva municipality showing the location of Grebenac

Populated places in Serbian Banat
Populated places in South Banat District
Bela Crkva
Romanian communities in Serbia